The 1993 Newsweek Tennis Classic was a men's tennis tournament played on outdoor hard courts at the William H.G. FitzGerald Tennis Center in Washington, D.C. in the United States that was part of the Championship Series of the 1993 ATP Tour. It was the 25th edition of the tournament was held from July 19 through July 25, 1993. Eighth-seeded Amos Mansdorf won the singles title.

Finals

Singles

 Amos Mansdorf defeated  Todd Martin 7–6(7–3), 7–5
 It was Mansdorf's first singles title of the year and the sixth, and last, of his career.

Doubles

 Byron Black /  Rick Leach defeated  Grant Connell /  Patrick Galbraith 6–4, 7–5

References

External links
 Official website
 ATP tournament profile

Sovran Bank Classic
Washington Open (tennis)
1993 in sports in Washington, D.C.
1993 in American tennis